FSV Zwickau is a German association football club located in Zwickau, Saxony. Today's club claims as part of its complex heritage sides that were East Germany's first champions: 1948 Ostzone winners SG Planitz and 1950 DDR-Oberliga champions ZSG Horch Zwickau.

History
In addition to the earliest East German championship sides, current day club FSV Zwickau can name a long list of other local associations among its predecessors.

Planitzer Sportclub
Fußball-Club Planitz was established 27 April 1912 in a village of that name located south of Zwickau. On 28 August that year the team adopted the name Planitzer Sportclub and in 1918 was briefly known as Sportvereinigung Planitz, before again becoming SC on 2 February 1919. The club's first notable appearance was in the playoffs of the regional Mitteldeutschland (Central German) league in 1931 that saw them advance as far as the semi-finals.

Under the Nazis, German football was reorganized in 1933 into sixteen top-flight divisions known as Gauligen. Planitz played in the Gauliga Sachsen where they struggled early on, but improved steadily until in the early 1940s they regularly duelled rivals Dresdner SC for the division title, taking the prize in 1942. They advanced to the national level quarter finals where they were put out 2–3 by eventual vice-champions Vienna Wien. Through the late 1930s and early 1940s, Dresdner made several early round appearances in play for the Tschammerpokal, predecessor of today's DFB-Pokal (German Cup).

Ostzone winners in divided Germany

In the aftermath of World War II most German organizations, including sports and football clubs, were dissolved by the occupying Allied authorities. In 1945, the club became part of Sportgruppe Planitz, an association made up of several area clubs. Football competition quickly resumed throughout the country and SG emerged as champions of the Soviet-controlled Ostzone (East Zone) through a 1:0 victory over SG Freiimfelde Halle on 4 July 1948 in Leipzig. The club was scheduled to represent the eastern region of the country in the national playoffs in a preliminary round match versus 1. FC Nürnberg, but were denied permission to travel to Stuttgart to play the match as a result of early Cold War tensions between the Soviets and the Western Allies. Nürnberg went on to claim the national title in a playoff staged under the authority of the German Football Association (Deutscher Fußball Bund) and made up entirely of Westzonen (Western Zones) teams. The following year Planitz had a poor season and failed to qualify for the playoffs.

In 1950 the club became part of BSG Aktivist Steinkohle Zwickau another postwar side which had been formed 14 June 1949. Sometime in 1951 part of this club broke away to become BSG Fortschritt Planitz which would in 1990 re-adopt the name SV Planitz. The remainder of Aktivist Steinkohle Zwickau was re-christened BSG Aktivist Karl-Marx Zwickau.

BSG Aktivist Karl-Marx Zwickau
This club also claimed the 1948 Ostzone champions as part of its lineage. They slipped to lower level local competition until re-appearing in the third tier 2. DDR-Liga, Staffel 4 in 1958. They captured that division in 1962 were promoted to the DDR-Liga, Staffel Süd (II). After a string of undistinguished campaigns, they became part of BSG Motor Zwickau in 1968 which was renamed BSG Sachsenring Zwickau on 1 May that year.

East Germany's first champions
Like many other teams in Soviet-occupied East Germany, Planitz would undergo a number of name changes associating the club with the "socialist work force" in various sectors of the economy in a commonly used propaganda device. They were renamed ZSG Horch Zwickau in 1949 and became part of East Germany's new top-flight circuit, the DDR-Oberliga, for the inaugural 1949–50 season. They emerged as the league's first champions with a disputed victory over Dresden Friedrichstadt on the last day of the season.

The unfortunate Dresdners had run afoul of communist authorities which regarded the club as being too bourgeois. Zwickau played a viciously physical game and, abetted by the referee who refused the homeside substitutions and eventually reduced Friedrichstadt to an 8-man squad, "won" the match 5–1. Unhappy Dresden Friedrichstadt fans invaded the field several times, and at game's end, badly beat a Zwickau player. Mounted police were called in to restore order. Within weeks the Dresden side was dismantled and the players scattered to other teams: most eventually fled to the west, many to play for Hertha Berlin. What occurred in this match foreshadowed what would become commonplace in East German football as highly placed politicians or bureaucrats manipulated clubs and matches for various purposes.

ZSG merged with BSG Aktivist Steinkohle Zwickau (established 14 June 1949) in 1950 becoming Betriebbsportgemeinschaft Horch Zwickau. In 1951 the club was re-christened BSG Aktivist Karl-Marx Zwickau. They remained competitive through the early 1950s but were unable to claim another national championship as in the following decades they settled into the role of a mid- or lower-table side. Zwickau enjoyed a measure of success in play for the FDGB-Pokal, or East German Cup. After a losing cup final appearance in 1954 they enjoyed victories in 1963, 1967, and 1975.

In 1968 the club merged with BSG Aktivist Karl Marx Zwickau to become BSG Sachsenring Zwickau. They finally took on their current name in 1990.

Internationally, the club had a good European Cup Winners Cup run in season 1975–76, advancing to the semi-finals with wins over Panathinaikos, AC Fiorentina, and Celtic F.C. before going out against eventual cup winner RSC Anderlecht. By the early 1980s they had descended to play in the second tier DDR-Liga, making just intermittent re-appearances in the DDR-Oberliga.

German re-unification
After German re-unification in 1990 the club found itself in the NOFV-Oberliga Süd (III) and in 1994 won promotion to the 2. Bundesliga where they would play four seasons. The team then descended through the third division to play in the fourth tier NOFV-Oberliga Süd. Financial problems in 2005 saw Zwickau sent down to the Landesliga Sachsen (V), but a successful campaign in 2005–06 earned them promotion yet again to the Oberliga. After six NOFV-Oberliga seasons the club won the league in 2012 and earned promotion to the reformed tier four Regionalliga Nordost where it was playing as an upper table side till 2015–16 season. Zwickau crowned as champion of Regionalliga Nordost and faced with SV Elversberg, 2nd of Regionalliga Südwest at promotion play-offs. Zwickau won playoffs with 2–1 aggregate and returned third level after 16 years in 2015–16 season.

Honours
Championship of the Eastern Zone
Winners: 1948
DDR-Oberliga:
Winners: 1949–50
FDGB-Pokal:
Winners: 1962–63, 1966–67, 1974–75
Gauliga Sachsen:
Winners: 1942
Regionalliga Nordost (IV):
Winners: 2015–16
NOFV-Oberliga Süd (V):
Winners: 1991–92, 1993–94, 2011–12
Landesliga Sachsen (VI):
Winners: 2005–06

Players

Current squad

Out on loan

Notable players
Jürgen Croy, one of the greatest East German goalkeepers of all time, spent 17 seasons at Zwickau until retiring in 1981, and then went on to coach the club from 1984 to 1988
Heinz Satrapa won the DDR-Oberliga scoring title as part of the 1950 championship side before going on to enjoy a long career as a player and coach with various clubs
Dwayne De Rosario was a successful player in Major League Soccer and is Canada's leading goal scorer internationally.
Olegs Karavajevs

Managers

FSV Zwickau in Europa

Recent seasons
The recent season-by-season performance of the club:

 With the introduction of the Regionalligas in 1994 and the 3. Liga in 2008 as the new third tier, below the 2. Bundesliga, all leagues below dropped one tier.

Key

Stadium

Since 2016, the club plays in the newly constructed GGZ-Arena in Zwickau's Eckersbach quarter. The stadium's current maximum capacity is 10,000 spectators, though this number could be increased to 15,000 in the event of a promotion to the 2. Bundesliga.

References

External links
 
The Abseits Guide to German Soccer

 
Football clubs in Germany
Football clubs in East Germany
Football clubs in Saxony
Association football clubs established in 1912
Zwickau
1912 establishments in Germany
2. Bundesliga clubs
3. Liga clubs